Demarest station is located in Demarest, Bergen County, New Jersey, United States. The station's depot was added to the National Register of Historic Places on July 7, 2004.

History
The station was designed by architect J. Cleaveland Cady and built in 1872 on the Northern Railroad of New Jersey line.  The station was named after State Senator Ralph S. Demarest, who was a director of the railroad and owned the land that the station was built upon. The borough of Demarest took the name when incorporated in 1903. The depot was purchased by the borough of Demarest in 1977 and is used as a senior center. The Demarest Historical Society also uses the depot.

The depot is currently undergoing the final stage of a renovation that started in 2002.

Passenger service for the station ended in 1966.  The rail line is still used for freight transport as part of the CSX Northern Branch.

See also 
 National Register of Historic Places listings in Bergen County, New Jersey
Englewood station (Erie Railroad)
Tenafly station, a NRHP-listed station along the line
Timeline of Jersey City, New Jersey-area railroads
Operating Passenger Railroad Stations Thematic Resource
List of NJ Transit railroad stations

References 

Demarest, New Jersey
Railway stations in the United States opened in 1859
Railway stations in Bergen County, New Jersey
Railway stations on the National Register of Historic Places in New Jersey
Former railway stations in New Jersey
Former Erie Railroad stations
National Register of Historic Places in Bergen County, New Jersey
New Jersey Register of Historic Places
1859 establishments in New Jersey